Maneckji Seth Agiary is the second-oldest Zoroastrian fire temple (or agiary, Gujarati for "house of fire") in Mumbai, India, constructed in 1735. Banaji Limji Agiary, established in 1709, is the oldest. As in all Zoroastrian temples, non-Parsis are not allowed to enter. The architecture of the building is a mix of Persian and Greek Revival styles, with two lamassus standing guard at the temple entrance.

See also
 List of fire temples in India

References

Fire temples in India
1735 establishments in India
Religious buildings and structures in Mumbai
Religious buildings and structures completed in 1735